Ian Kerr Cook (26 August 1924 – 12 October 1989) was a Scottish footballer who played for Morton and Dumbarton. Cook was born on 28 August 1924. He married Jessie Paterson, and worked as a joiner following his retirement from professional football. He died from heart failure in Edinburgh on 12 October 1989, at the age of 65.

References

1924 births
1989 deaths
Association football outside forwards
Dumbarton F.C. players
Greenock Morton F.C. players
Scottish Football League players
Scottish footballers